Gary Mason (15 December 1962 – 6 January 2011) was a British professional boxer who was based in Chatham, Kent, England. He was born in Jamaica. Mason fought at the heavyweight level and became the British heavyweight champion in 1989. Mason was a top ten contender, his main strengths being his punching power and physical strength.

Mason died on 6 January 2011 in a cycling accident in South London.

Pro boxing career
Mason fought 38 times as a professional in a career that spanned 10 years from 1984 to 1994, with 37 wins (34 by knockout) and only one loss, that being to Lennox Lewis when he challenged for the European title in 1991. Mason gave Lewis his hardest fight up to that point in his career.

Mason defeated a number of well known heavyweights, including Tyrell Biggs, James Tillis, Alfonzo Ratliff, Ricky Parkey, James Pritchard, Louis Pergaud, Hughroy Currie and David Jaco.

Mason sparred with the former WBA World cruiserweight number one and avoided British heavyweight champion David Pearce. Pearce helped him with sparring in preparation for Mason's title fights during his exile from the sport. Mason praised Pearce and said he was instrumental in his helping his career.

He suffered a detached retina in a bout with Everett Martin in 1990. After a short retirement he staged a comeback, which ended with a TKO defeat by Lennox Lewis, which aggravated Mason's eye injury. He came back once again, but after winning two fights in the US he retired for good.

Professional boxing record

Rugby career
Mason played three rugby league matches for the London Crusaders (now London Broncos), scoring a try in his first game. Mason also played in occasional soccer matches as part of an 'Arsenal Celebrities' team at the old 'Highbury' football ground in North London.

Television appearances
Mason appeared in a special celebrity show of Gladiators that raised money for charity in 1993 which John Fashanu won. Mason also appeared on the panel of the ITV show You Bet!, and the second episode of the first series of GamesMaster in 1992 playing Sonic Blast Man arcade. Mason's home was also one of those featured on the panel show Through the Keyhole.

Death
On the morning of 6 January 2011 Mason died after being hit by a van in Sandy Lane South, Wallington, South London whilst cycling. He was pronounced dead at the scene.

References

External links
(archived by web.archive.org) Sutton Guardian

1962 births
2011 deaths
Cycling road incident deaths
English male boxers
English rugby league players
Heavyweight boxers
Jamaican emigrants to the United Kingdom
London Broncos players
Road incident deaths in London